Cyperus baoulensis is a species of sedge that is endemic to tropical areas of western Africa.

The species was first formally described by the botanist Georg Kükenthal in 1936.

See also
 List of Cyperus species

References

baoulensis
Plants described in 1936
Taxa named by Georg Kükenthal
Flora of Gabon
Flora of Ghana
Flora of Ivory Coast
Flora of Togo